Giuseppe de Giorgi (born 21 June 1953) is an Italian admiral and naval aviator. He was Chief of Staff of the Italian Navy from 28 January 2013 to 22 June 2016. He was Commander of the Maritime Task Force of the United Nations Interim Force in Lebanon (UNIFIL) from August 2006 to October 2006. He then became Chief of Staff of the Italian Joint Operations Headquarter, a position he held from 2007 to 2009, before serving as Chief of Staff to the Commander of the Italian Naval Fleet from 2009 to 2011. He served as Commander in Chief Naval Fleet from February 2012 to January 2013.

Among the different crisis he had to face during his tenure as Chief of the Italian Navy are the rescue of the MS Norman Atlantic and the management of the Operation Mare Nostrum.

De Giorgi attended the Italian Naval Academy in Livorno where he graduated in 1975 with the rank of ensign. He was then selected to attend advanced military courses in the United States at the Naval Air Station Pensacola and the Naval Air Station Corpus Christi where he graduated as naval aviator in 1976. He was the Commander of the ITS Vittorio Veneto from 1997 to 1999.

Collaboration with Sea Shepherd
In 2017 he embarked on the fleet of Sea Shepherd Conservation Society, the international non-profit organization that has been fighting since 1977 to protect the environment and the animals of the sea. With Sea Shepherd, De Giorgi participated in Operation Albacore, to stop illegal fishing along the coasts of Central-Eastern Africa.

Honors and awards

References

Italian admirals
Living people
1953 births
Knights Grand Cross of the Order of Merit of the Italian Republic
Recipients of the Order pro Merito Melitensi